Ronald Clark (21 May 1932 – 13 September 2013) was a Scottish professional footballer. He played as a left winger.

Clark started his career at the Scottish club Kilmarnock in 1951. He played only 16 matches in a five-year spell at the club, scoring three goals. He moved to Gillingham in 1956, where he had much more of an opportunity to play After spending two seasons at the club, playing 33 three matches and scoring 6 goals, Clark transferred to Oldham Athletic. In 1959, having made only four appearances for Oldham, he then transferred to Bedford Town.

References

External links

1932 births
People from Clarkston, East Renfrewshire
2013 deaths
Gillingham F.C. players
Oldham Athletic A.F.C. players
Kilmarnock F.C. players
Scottish footballers
Association football wingers
Scottish Football League players
English Football League players
Sportspeople from East Renfrewshire
Bedford Town F.C. players